The Legendary Moonlight Sculptor is a Korean light novel and web novel by Heesung Nam (남희성). The series has ended with 1450 episodes on the online website as of July 2019, and the latest published book is volume 57 as of April 2020.

 Plot 
The Legendary Moonlight Sculptor is the story of a man, Lee Hyun, who is a slave to money. He was formerly known as the legendary God of War of the highly popular MMORPG, Continent of Magic. In an attempt to help his debt-ridden family, he auctions his character to find it sell at ₩3.1 billion. An unfortunate run-up with loan sharks causes Lee Hyun to lose almost all of his money, however. This caused him to step into the new era of gaming led by the first-ever Virtual Reality MMORPG, Royal Road, to help his ailing grandmother and save enough for his sister's future college tuition.

 Characters 
 Famous Characters 
 Weed (Lee Hyun) 
A high school drop-out, Lee Hyun is talented gamer with an enormous debt, primarily inherited from his deceased parents. To raise money, he places his gaming avatar, Weed from the Continent of Magic on auction, causing an uproar due its fame as the game's strongest avatar, and earns ₩3.09 billion (roughly $2.76 million) from it. Due to the inherited debt however, much of the money is collected by loan sharks, leaving Lee Hyun with around ₩90 million (roughly $75,000). With his ailing grandmother and younger sister in mind, he joins the recently launched VR-MMORPG, Royal Road to earn more money. Lee Hyun presently uses his old avatar name, Weed, on Royal Road.

Over the course of the story, he is given the secret class - Legendary Moonlight Sculptor. His quick growth and achievements earn him a spot in the Royal Road Hall of Fame, which allows the game's top 500 players to place videos of their adventures online. Through a series of quests, he becomes the Lord of Morata, and later the King of Arpen. He is often referred to as the Greatest Ruler in the North. He is sometimes expressed as head priest of puljook shingyo (grass stewism) because he enslaved hundreds of gamers to build a giant sphinx. He only gives grass stew for them.

Seoyoon (Jeong Seoyoon) 
Seoyoon, popularly known as the Goddess in Royal Road, is the female protagonist of the series. Described as a spectacularly beautiful woman, Seoyoon was left emotionless and mute due to childhood trauma. She started playing Royal Road as a method for trauma therapy, and plays as a silent berserker. In Volume 39, she begins dating Weed. As of Volume 42, Chapter 8, Seoyoon is at a level mark of 471.

Yurin (Lee Hayan) 
Lee Hayan is Weed's younger sister, and the primary reason behind the latter's actions to make money - college tuition. She is introduced in Volume 1 as a high school student, and later proceeds to enrol to a university as a student in liberal arts. After successful acceptance, she decides to start playing Royal Road alongside her brother. She is presently a level 80, Aqualight Painter affiliated with the Arpen Kingdom.

Da'in 
Weed first encounters Dain in the City of Heaven in Lavia, inside a dungeon known as the Cave of Dead Warriors. She is an exceptionally skilled shaman due to her unique style of training, and is a founding member of the famous Hermes Guild. Through the course of their time together, Dain is encouraged by Weed's personality to undergo a high-risk medical surgery in the real world. She was also Weed's first love.

Hwaryeong (Jeong Hyo-Lin) 
Jeong Hyo-Lin is a world-renowned and successful singer, who plays the game as Hwaryeong, a dancer class, to relieve the stress of being famous yet single. Like Weed, she is familiar with the importance of increasing skill proficiency over regular levelling, making her a formidable character despite the weak profession or class. It is later revealed that she has feelings for Weed, though unrequited.

Geomchi (Ahn Hyundo) 
Ahn Hyundo is a former World Swords Fighting Champion, having won the competition for four consecutive years before retiring to hone his skill with the sword. He joins his disciple Weed in Royal Road after witnessing the latter's improvement with the sword in the real life by experiencing combat in the game world. Known throughout Korea as the leader of the largest and finest Dojang of South Korea, Ahn Hyundo had initially decided to venture into Royal Road by himself, only to have his inner circle follow him into the game. Based on an inference from Volume 37, Chapter 10, Geomchi is estimated to be above the level mark of 400. He later unlocks the secret class profession - the Martial Artist, and is affiliated with the Arpen Kingdom.

Bard Ray 
Bard Ray, translated occasionally as either Bad Ray or Bradley, is an American gamer in Royal Road of the unique Black Knight class. He's known to have arisen from being somebody's minion to a knight and then an Earl by means of treachery. Using the influence and power of the Hermes Guild, he wages a ruthless conquest, which results in him becoming the Emperor of the Haven Empire. Popularly known as the God of Weapons, he's currently at a level mark of 560.

Famous Non-Player Characters (NPCs)

Geihar von Arpen (The First Emperor) 
Having conquered the whole continent, Geihar von Arpen was the first to become Emperor in the Royal Road universe. He is a historical singularity, being a master sculptor, a master sword master, and an emperor. Due to the prejudices surrounding the sculptor class as being useless, he stated the lack of worthy successors in his legacy. After his death the empire collapsed and split into multiple kingdoms.

Van Hawk (Death Knight) 
Van Hawk was a Death Knight under the direct command of the Undead Lich King, Bar Khan. He was entrusted with the task of guarding the stolen relic of Freya, Helain's Grail, which was enshrined at Bar Khan's crypt in the Sky City of Lavia. Weed defeated him en route to completing his retrieval of Helain's Grail and was awarded the Crimson Necklace of Life as a result, which he could later use to summon Van Hawk. Through the course of the story, the Death Knight is freed from the influence of Bar Khan and pledges his loyalty to Weed, which meant that the latter could now summon him even without the necklace. After being freed from the Lich King's influence, Van Hawk is able to remember parts of his life prior to becoming an Undead.

Bahamorg (Barbarian) 
Bahamorg is a barbarian-class sculptural lifeform created by Geihar Von Arpen, the first emperor to have conquered the whole continent in the Royal Road lore. He currently acknowledges Weed as his master after being revived by the latter through the Sculptural Life Bestowal ability. He dual-wields using an axe and a mace, and of the 47 sculptural lifeforms, ranks as the strongest. Known as the Hero of Arpen, Bahamorg is known to have an astoundingly high level mark of 588.

Hestiger (Sun Warrior) 
A powerful and historical figure from the warring age and the right hand of the Pallos Empire, Hesitgar was briefly resurrected by Weed to lead the battle against the Haven Empire's six imperial army divisions. Weed used the Sculptural Resurrection technique to resurrect him for twenty-four hours. Hestiger defended the Arpen Kingdom at the Earth Palace battle, with the command for destroying both the second and sixth army divisions of Haven's imperial army. In the battle, he killed Haven's imperial commander - Drom. After the destruction of the imperial army, Weed and Hestiger hunted through the night over three continents. As the resurrection time expired, Hestiger granted Weed an S-Rank quest. A Knight-class, Desert Warrior, he is also remembered for receiving the title - Saviour of the World.

Roderick (Battle Mage) 
Roderick is a famous historical figure, briefly resurrected by Weed - twenty-one hours - to aid the latter's effort to free the Central Continent from Lesser Demon Lord Montus and an army of demon soldiers. As the legendary battle-mage, Roderick is known to utilize powerful and unique spells for combat; he is also capable of casting several spells rapidly without having to worry about mana limitations. In his battles, it is also revealed that he is capable of absorbing mana from the environment.

Torido (True Vampire Lord) 
Lord Torido, also translated as Tori, is the leader of the True Blood Vampire Clan, and is also one of the forty-seven rules of Todeum - a vampire kingdom with three moons. Weed encounters Tor as a part of a questline to free the Morata region and the Paladins of Freya's Church; it was mentioned that the clan possessed more than a thousand soldiers, with the lowest ranking vampire being level 270. At the time, Lord Torido was known to hold a level mark of 400. He first appeared in Volume 3, Chapter 10. After his death at the hands of Weed, Lord Torido drops a summoning necklace similar to the one dropped by Van Hawk. He later pledges absolute loyalty to Weed in the Plains of Despair, having previously served Bar Khan. The pledge was undertaken through the Power of the Blood Oath, which granted Weed a unique item - Vampire's Blood; it held the power to permanently increase mana by 300 with the possibility of randomly increasing or decreasing other statistics. Lord Torido briefly became Seoyoon's follower in Volume 9, but was once again traded to Weed for a rabbit.

Legacy of Geihar von Arpen 
The legacy of Geihar von Arpen was left in the Lair of Litvart, in a secret cave hidden within the dungeon, to be found by someone worthy of the secret class - Legendary Moonlight Sculptor. It was entrusted to Sage Rodriguez's family. Weed later discovers the legacy, and accidentally accepts the secret class as his own. Geihar left a parchment scroll and a few volumes of books for the inheritor of his legacy. Below are the excerpts of some of the letters left behind: 
 [I] Successor to the Legendary Emperor
 
 I am Geihar Von Arpen, the first emperor of the Continent, the one who put an end to timeless divisions. My final years of life have been far from fulfilling. No one has recognized my distress, my superiority! Why does no one understand my profession? Why does everyone look down upon my profession with disrespect? Enslaved to their prejudices, the talented have refused to understand my goodwill and succeed me in my trade. Even with my children, this form of prejudice is true! Those idiots and senseless bunch! They do not deserve to be my successor!
 
 So, I entrust my secret trade to you.

 [II] Successor to the Legendary Emperor
 
 I love beautiful statues. The statues that are carved with the magnificent spirit of Kvasir have never forsaken me. As long as I love and trust them, they are loyal to me. Who would believe this? That this lowly ‘Sculptor’ class became the cornerstone of my power, from a humble farmer in a country town to the man who united the Continent. Listen well, my successor who walks in the path of a sculptor. A very difficult path awaits you. The path that a hundred out of a hundred men shall give up and a nation of men will not fare any better. However, my successor, I encourage you to stay the course in the face of the toughest challenges.  Hardship brings a value of its own, and toughness produces a result of its own too. Become the Grand Master of Sculpting! You must learn the secrets of Sculpture Mastery which I failed to learn.  It shall remain the wish of every man who has learned the sculptural art. Therefore, I hereby entrust to you these small gifts.
Along with the letters, Geihar von Arpen left two rare items - Medicine Tablet of the Emperor, known to permanently increase mana by 200, and the Book of Secret Sword Techniques from the Imperial Family of Arpen, which teaches its user the Imperial Formless Sword Skill.

Weed was dismissive of the sculptor class to begin with, just as those described in Geihar's letters, refusing the secret class - Moonlight Sculptor when first offered. However, he accepts the class as it represents itself as the Legendary Emperor class through the legacy questline. Weed discovers shortly after that the class is, in fact, that of the Legendary Moonlight Sculptor. He later uncovers the value of the class as amongst the most powerful within the Royal Road universe.

Media

Light novels 
The Legendary Moonlight Sculptor first published as a Korean light novel authored by Heesung Nam (남희성). The series began publication in January 2007, and has published 57 volumes so far. After a hiatus in 2017, the author confirmed the resumption of the serialization in 2018 on his personal blog.

Manhwa 
A manhwa was spun-off from the original Light Novels by writer, Grimza, and artist, Kim Tae-Hyung. The content of the webtoon doesn't deviate from the novels, with the first season (fifty-two chapters) covering the story until Volume 2, Chapter 7, and the second season (fifty-three chapters) covering the story until Volume 5, Chapter 4. The third season covers the story until Volume 8, Chapter 6. It is currently published in the Kakao Magazine.

Impact 
The series has sold more than a million books in a market with an estimated 3.5 million readers, and consistently ranks in first place in terms of eBook sales.

References 

21st-century South Korean novels